Carlos Eduardo Lopes Cruz (born 8 August 1997), commonly known as Cadu, is a Brazilian professional footballer who plays as a midfielder for Baník Ostrava, on loan from FC Viktoria Plzeň.

Club career

FK Pardubice
Cadu made his league debut for FK Pardubice against FK Dukla Prague on 10 June 2020.

Baník Ostrava (loan)
On 8 September 2022 he was loaned to Baník Ostrava in Czech First League.

References

External links
 
 

1997 births
Living people
Brazilian footballers
Brazilian expatriate footballers
Association football forwards
Sportspeople from Salvador, Bahia
Fluminense de Feira Futebol Clube players
FK Pardubice players
FC Viktoria Plzeň players
Czech National Football League players
Czech First League players
Expatriate footballers in the Czech Republic
Brazilian expatriate sportspeople in the Czech Republic
FC Baník Ostrava players